Nancy Dawson was the stage name of Ann Newton (c.1728-1767), an English dancer and actress.  She rose to fame performing a solo rendition of a hornpipe between acts in The Beggar's Opera at Covent Garden Theatre in London in 1759. The hornpipe tune is now known as "Here We Go Round the Mulberry Bush".

Life
One source says she was born in London in 1730. Another source says she may have been born at Axminster, Devon. At sixteen she joined the company of a certain Griffin, a puppet-showman, who taught her to dance; and a figure dancer of Sadler's Wells, seeing her performance, found her a place at his own theatre. As the story goes, her figure, novelty and technical excellence made her career. The hornpipe tune was said to be by Thomas Arne and is known now as "Here We Go Round the Mulberry Bush".

In her second summer season at Sadler's Wells Nancy Dawson was promoted to the part of Columbine, and in the following winter she made her first appearance at Covent Garden Theatre under Edward Shuter, in The Prophetess by Thomas Betterton. On 22 April 1758 the Merry Wives of Windsor was played for her benefit. In October 1759, during the run of the Beggar's Opera, the man who danced the hornpipe among the thieves fell ill, and his place was taken by Nancy Dawson. From that moment she became a celebrity. The production enjoyed an unusually long run, and the house was crowded nightly.

Nancy Dawson was induced by an increase of salary to move to Drury Lane, where she appeared for the first time on 23 September 1760 in the Beggar's Opera. Here for the next three years she dance in its frequent revivals, and in a variety of Christmas entertainments, such as ‘Harlequin's Invasion,’ ‘Fortunatus,’ and the ‘Enchanter’ in which there also appeared the elder Joseph Grimaldi and the Miss Baker who succeeded Nancy Dawson in popular favour as a dancer. On Christmas Eve 1763 a pantomime called the ‘Rites of Hecate’ was produced at Drury Lane, and on that day and the 26th of the month Nancy Dawson appeared; but her name is absent from the bills of subsequent representations.

Her death took place at Haverstock Hill on 26 May 1767. She was buried in the graveyard belonging to the parish of St George the Martyr, Bloomsbury, behind the Foundling Hospital.

Ballad
The hornpipe by which she danced into fame was performed to a tune (thought to be probably by Thomas Arne) which then had words set, a song called Ballad of Nancy Dawson attributed to George Alexander Stevens. It was for a long time the popular air of the day. It was set with variations for the harpsichord as Miss Dawson's hornpipe, was introduced in Carey's and Bickerstaffe's opera ‘Love in a Village,’ and is mentioned as ‘Nancy Dawson’ by Oliver Goldsmith in the epilogue to She Stoops to Conquer. 
The Ballad of Nancy Dawson

Of all the girls in our town,
The red, the black, the fair, the brown,
That dance and prance it up and down,
There's none like Nancy Dawson.

Her easy mien, her shape so neat,
She foots, she trips, she looks so sweet;
Her every motion’s so complete,
I die for Nancy Dawson.

See how she comes to give surprise,
With joy and pleasure in her eyes:
To give delight she always tries,
So means my Nancy Dawson.

Was there no task, t’obstruct the way,
No shutter old, no house so gay,
A bet of fifty pounds I’d lay,
That I gained Nancy Dawson.

See how the opera takes a run
Exceeding Hamlet, Lear and Lun
Though in it there would be no fun,
Was’t not for Nancy Dawson.

Though beard and brent charm ev’ry night
And female peachum’s justly right,
And filch and lockit please the sight,
‘Tis kept by Nancy Dawson.

See little davey strut and puff,
‘Confound the opera and such stuff,
My house is never full enough,
A curse on Nancy Dawson”.

Though G[arric]k he had has his day
And forced the town his laws t’obey,
With Jonny Rich is come in play,
With the help of Nancy Dawson.

In literature

References

External links 
 The Fiddler’s Companion, NA

Attribution

1720s births
1767 deaths
English female dancers